Mojtame-e Shahid Namju (also Romanized as Mojtame'-e Shahīd Nāmjū) is a village in Jamalabad Rural District of Sharifabad District of Pakdasht County, Tehran province, Iran. At the 2006 National Census, its population was 7,281 in 1,999 households. The following census in 2011 counted 6,676 people in 1,905 households. The latest census in 2016 showed a population of 22,990 people in 6,892 households; it was the largest village in its rural district.

References 

Pakdasht County

Populated places in Tehran Province

Populated places in Pakdasht County